Robert Abercrombie Pringle (December 15, 1855 – January 9, 1922) was a Canadian lawyer and politician.

Born in Cornwall, Canada West, the son of J. F. Pringle and Isabella Fraser, Pringle was educated in public and high schools and Queen's University. A lawyer, he was treasurer of the town of Cornwall. A Conservative in politics, he served in the House of Commons from 1900 to 1908.

He was elected to the House of Commons of Canada for Cornwall and Stormont in the 1900 federal election. A Conservative, he was re-elected in the 1904 election but was defeated in 1908.

During the 1907 financial panic, Pringle wrote a criticism of the Canadian banking System. Another MP, banker Robert Bickerdike, took him to task, and put such pressure on him through negative articles in the media of the time that Pringle backed down. The next time the bank charters were renewed, instead of addressing the laxness of regulation that had led to the panic,  several changes were made to suit the bankers.(The later collapse of the Home bank demonstrated the need for tightening of regulation of the banks.)

References
 The Canadian Parliament; biographical sketches and photo-engravures of the senators and members of the House of Commons of Canada. Being the tenth Parliament, elected November 3, 1904

Specific

External links
 

1855 births
1922 deaths
Conservative Party of Canada (1867–1942) MPs
Members of the House of Commons of Canada from Ontario
Queen's University at Kingston alumni